Penn State Erie (Behrend) is a census-designated place located in Harborcreek Township, Erie County in the U.S. state of Pennsylvania. It is located around the campus of Penn State Erie and near the city of Erie. As of the 2010 census the population was 1,629.

Demographics

References

External links

Census-designated places in Erie County, Pennsylvania